Salling is the surname of the following people
Augusta Salling (born 1954), finance minister of Greenland
Harald Salling-Mortensen (1902–1969), Danish architect
Herman Salling (1919–2006), Danish grocery store founder and director
John B. Salling (1856–1959), veteran of the American Civil War
John Peter Salling, 18th century German explorer
Lotte Salling (born 1964), Danish writer 
Mark Salling (1982–2018), American actor and musician who pleaded guilty to child pornography charges in 2017

Danish-language surnames